The 1992 Nigerian Senate election in Lagos State was held on July 4, 1992, to elect members of the Nigerian Senate to represent Lagos State. Kofoworola Bucknor representing Lagos Central, Bola Tinubu representing Lagos West and Anthony Adefuye representing Lagos East all won on the platform of the Social Democratic Party.

Overview

Summary

Results

Lagos Central 
The election was won by Kofoworola Bucknor of the Social Democratic Party.

Lagos West 
The election was won by Bola Tinubu of the Social Democratic Party.

Lagos East 
The election was won by Anthony Adefuye of the Social Democratic Party.

References 

Lag
Lagos State Senate elections
July 1992 events in Nigeria